Autocesta Zagreb–Macelj (Croatian for "Zagreb–Macelj Motorway") is a Croatian limited liability company founded pursuant to decision of the government of the Republic of Croatia of 27 March 2003 to facilitate construction and subsequent management of a motorway between Zagreb and Macelj border crossing to Slovenia. The company was subsequently granted concession for construction and management of the A2 motorway, and restructured in the process: The Republic of Croatia retained 49% of ownership stake in the company, while 51% ownership stake was attained by Walter Motorway, owned by Walter Bau AG, Strabag and Dywidag. The company was granted the motorway management concession for a period of 28 years.

The A2 motorway regulated by the concession contract is managed by Egis Road Operation Croatia, a subsidiary of French company Egis Projects.

The company currently manages or develops the following routes:

The company is managed by the president of the board Miloš Savić and member of the board Ivica Mlinarević.

See also 
Highways in Croatia
Hrvatske autoceste
Hrvatske ceste

References

External links 

Egis Road Operation Croatia

Construction and civil engineering companies of Croatia
Construction and civil engineering companies established in 2003
Transport companies of Croatia
Croatian companies established in 2003